Donald Angus Wilson (22 October 1914 – 6 December 2015) is  a former Australian rules footballer who played with Footscray in the Victorian Football League (VFL).

Notes

External links 
		

1914 births
2015 deaths
Australian rules footballers from Victoria (Australia)
Western Bulldogs players
Spotswood Football Club players
Australian centenarians
Men centenarians